The 1908 Idaho gubernatorial election was held on November 3, 1908. Republican nominee James H. Brady defeated Democratic nominee Moses Alexander with 49.61% of the vote.

General election

Candidates
Major party candidates
James H. Brady, Republican 
Moses Alexander, Democratic

Other candidates
Ernest Untermann, Socialist
William C. Stalker, Prohibition
E.W. Johnson, Independent

Results

References

1908
Idaho
Gubernatorial